The 2020–21 season is the 63rd season in the club history of the handball branch of Zamalek, the season began with Egyptian Handball League on the 28th of September 2020, as Zamalek competes for the Egyptian Handball League, Egypt Handball Cup.

Current squad

Staff
Staff for the 2020–21 season.

Team
Squad for the 2020–21 season.

Competitions

Overview

Egyptian League

First Stage

Matches 

(Round 1)

(Round 2)

(Round 3)

(Round 4)

(Round 5)

(Round 6)

(Round 7)

(Round 8)

Final stage 

 Note First Team Qualified for a play-off final match to determine the League champion, according to the regulations, after equal points.

Matches 

(Round 1 )

(Round 2)

(Round 3)

(Round 4)

(Round 5)

(Round 6)

(Round 7)

(Round 8)

(Round 9)

(Round 10)

(Round 11)

(Round 12)

(Round 13)

(Round 14)

Playoff

Egyptian Cup

(Round of 16)

(Quarter-finals)

(Semi-finals)

(Finals)

Records and Statistics 

 Season Topscorer : Ahmed El-Ahmar (123 Goals)
 Biggest Win : 43–13 Vs Aviation
 Biggest Defeat : 24–30 Vs Sporting
 Longest Wins Run : 12 Game
(from 18 February 2021 to 15 April 2021) 
 Longest Unbeaten Run : 15 Game
(from 18 February 2021 to 24 April 2021)
 Derby :  2 Win – 1 Draw – 1 Lose

Top Score

References

Zamalek SC
Handball in Egypt
Zamalek SC seasons